Beomeosa Station is a station of the Busan Metro Line 1 in Cheongnyong-dong, Geumjeong District, Busan, South Korea. It is the nearest metro station to the Beomeosa temple.

Station Layout

Gallery

External links
  Cyber station information from Busan Transportation Corporation

Busan Metro stations
Geumjeong District
Railway stations in South Korea opened in 1985